The 2005 Peach Bowl was a college football bowl game played on December 30, 2005, at the Georgia Dome in Atlanta Georgia. The game feature two teams ranked in the top-10 of the AP Poll, as the ninth-ranked Miami Hurricanes battled the 10th-ranked LSU Tigers. The game was the 38th edition of the Peach Bowl and, with sponsorship from Chick-fil-A, was officially the Chick-fil-A Peach Bowl; this would be the final time until 2014 that "Peach" was included in the bowl's name.

Miami took an early 3–0 lead on a 21-yard field goal from Jon Peattie. LSU responded with Chris Jackson kicking a 37-yard field goal as the teams were tied at 3 after one quarter. In the second quarter, backup quarterback Matt Flynn threw a 51-yard touchdown pass to wide receiver Craig Davis as LSU led 10–3. A 47-yard Chris Jackson field goal, and a 4-yard touchdown pass from Flynn to Joseph Addai gave the Tigers a 20–3 halftime lead.

In the third quarter, Addai scored on a 6-yard touchdown run extending the lead to 27–3. Jacob Hester's one-yard touchdown run gave the Tigers a 34–3 lead. In the fourth quarter, Mario Stevenson and Chris Jackson kicked field goals to give the Tigers the 40–3 win.

References

Peach Bowl
Peach Bowl
LSU Tigers football bowl games
Miami Hurricanes football bowl games
December 2005 sports events in the United States
Peach
2005 in Atlanta